Mario Tontodonati (August 31, 1923 in Scafa – June 24, 2009 in Fontecchio) was an Italian professional football player.

He played for 7 seasons (206 games, 51 goals) in the Serie A for A.S. Bari, A.S. Roma, A.S. Lucchese Libertas 1905 and A.C. Torino.

References

1923 births
2009 deaths
Italian footballers
Serie A players
Delfino Pescara 1936 players
S.S.C. Bari players
A.S. Roma players
S.S.D. Lucchese 1905 players
Torino F.C. players
Association football forwards